Richard Karron (April 11, 1934 – March 1, 2017) was an American actor and voice actor who was noted for his distinctive voice.

Richard Karron was born on April 11, 1934, in Bronx, New York, as Richard Karant. He was an actor, known for History of the World: Part I, The Flintstones in Viva Rock Vegas and Fatso.

Early life
Karron was born in Bronx, New York to Samuel and Gertrude Karant. He served in the Army in the Korean War for eight years and was an Honor Guard at the Tomb of the Unknown Soldier. After a career as a salesman, he then was discovered by Dustin Hoffman at 'Catch a Rising Star' in New York and started an acting career. Richard was in the entertainment industry including stage, TV, movies and voice overs well into his late 60s and early 70s. Richard married his wife, Judy, in September 2001 and they later moved from New York to Wrightsville Beach, NC. Richard quickly contributed to the community through his dog, Catalina and Canines for Service and self-recovery programs.

Filmography

Film

TV

References

External links

1934 births
2017 deaths
People from the Bronx
Male actors from New York City
American male film actors
American male television actors
20th-century American male actors